This is a list of state parks and reserves in the Montana state park system, in the United States.

Current parks

Former state parks
Parker Homestead State Park in Jefferson County reverted to private ownership in 2010.

See also
List of U.S. national parks

References

External links

Montana State Parks Montana Fish, Wildlife & Parks

 
Montana
State parks
Protected areas of Montana
Tourist attractions in Montana